Siril Pettus, known professionally as Bandmanrill, is an American rapper and songwriter from Newark, New Jersey. He is currently signed to Warner Music Group and is noted as a pioneer of the hip-hop scene with his fusing of elements of Jersey club and drill.

Career 
He began rapping in 2020 during the COVID-19 pandemic. In April 2021, he released his track "Heartbroken" which was selected by Pitchfork as the "must-hear rap song of the day". In November 2021, he released a freestyle titled "Tonight’s Da Night Freestyle". In August 2022, he released his single titled "Real Hips", which is described by Jon Caramanica of The New York Times as "a surprisingly luscious and nimble offering from the Newark rapper Bandmanrill that makes plain the through lines that connect drill music, Jersey club and bass music". In October 2022, he released his debut project Club Godfather., which contains collaborations with NLE Choppa, Lay Bankz, Skaiwater, Sha EK, and DJ swill.

References

External links 
 

Living people
21st-century American rappers
African-American male rappers
People from New Jersey
Rappers from New Jersey
Rappers from Newark, New Jersey
Year of birth missing (living people)